Madenat Alhaq is a village in Dhofar Governorate, in southwestern Oman. north by road from Taqah.

References

Populated places in the Dhofar Governorate